Tettigomyiini is a tribe of cicadas in the family Cicadidae, found in Africa and Madagascar. There are about 8 genera and at least 60 described species in Tettigomyiini.

Genera
These eight genera belong to the tribe Tettigomyiini:
 Bavea Distant, 1905
 Gazuma Distant, 1905
 Paectira Karsch, 1890
 Spoerryana Boulard, 1974
 Stagea Villet, 1994
 Stagira Stål, 1861
 Tettigomyia Amyot & Audinet-Serville, 1843
 Xosopsaltria Kirkaldy, 1904

References

Further reading

 
 
 
 
 
 
 
 

 
Tettigomyiinae
Hemiptera tribes